Cactus is a city in Moore County, Texas, United States, located along U.S. Route 287. The population was 3,179 at the 2010 census.

"Cactus Texas", a song by Waylon Jennings, is a sketch of Cactus from years past.

Geography

Cactus is located at  (36.046124, –102.002251).

Economy
JBS USA has a beef plant in Cactus.

Demographics

2020 Census

As of the 2020 United States census, there were 3,057 people, 1,021 households, and 668 families residing in the city.

2010 Census
As of the census of 2010, 3,179 people, 801 households, and 650 families resided in the city. The population density was 1,558.1 people per square mile (601.7/km). The 908 housing units averaged 445.0 per square mile (171.9/km). The racial makeup of the city was 48.22% White, 1.01% African American, 2.8% Native American, 19.35% Asian, 24.41% from other races, and 3.84% from two or more races. Hispanics or Latinos of any race were 74.08% of the population. 67.9% of the city identified themselves as being of Mexican origin and 16.4% identified themselves as being of Burmese origin.

Of the 801 households, 54.7% had children under the age of 18 living with them, 57.8% were married couples living together, 12.4% had a female householder with no husband present, and 18.9% were not families. About 9.7% of all households were made up of individuals, and 1.5% had someone living alone who was 65 years of age or older. The average household size was 3.97 and the average family size was 4.26.

In the city, the population was distributed as 37.34% under the age of 18, 12.8% from 18 to 24, 30% from 25 to 44, 16.6% from 45 to 64, and 3.4% who were 65 years of age or older. The median age was 25 years. For every 100 females, there were 127.2 males. For every 100 females age 18 and over, there were 131.4 males.

2000 Census
As of the census of 2000, 2,538 people, 660 households, and 570 families resided in the city. The population density was 1,243.9 people per square mile (480.4/km). The 820 housing units averaged 401.9 per square mile (155.2/km). The racial makeup of the city was 24.43% White, 0.55% African American, 0.87% Native American, 0.28% Asian, 71.24% from other races, and 2.64% from two or more races. Hispanics or Latinos of any race were 96.10% of the population.

Of the 660 households, 67.1% had children under the age of 18 living with them, 68.0% were married couples living together, 11.8% had a female householder with no husband present, and 13.5% were not families. About 8.3% of all households were made up of individuals, and 1.7% had someone living alone who was 65 years of age or older. The average household size was 3.85 and the average family size was 4.10.

In the city, the population was distributed as 42.7% under the age of 18, 13.9% from 18 to 24, 30.7% from 25 to 44, 10.3% from 45 to 64, and 2.4% who were 65 years of age or older. The median age was 22 years. For every 100 females, there were 118.8 males. For every 100 females age 18 and over, there were 115.7 males.

The median income for a household in the city was $25,611, and for a family was $26,250. Males had a median income of $21,384 versus $18,110 for females. The per capita income for the city was $8,340. About 21.4% of families and 22.3% of the population were below the poverty line, including 25.3% of those under age 18 and 15.4% of those age 65 or over.

Government 
The City of Cactus government is a commission-manager government with a mayor and five commissioners all elected from the city at-large, and a city manager appointed by the commission to serve as the administrative manager of the city.

The current mayor is Socorro Marquez.

Education
The City of Cactus is served by the Dumas Independent School District.
 Cactus Elementary School
 Dumas Intermediate School
 Dumas Junior High School
 Dumas High School

Tornado

On April 21, 2007, Cactus was hit by an EF2 tornado.  In all, 16 tornadoes were reported across the Texas Panhandle on that Saturday evening, including one in Tulia that damaged several businesses and injured three people, but Cactus suffered comparably greater damage.  City and Moore County officials, including Cactus City Manager Jeff Jenkins, estimated about one-third of Cactus either was damaged or destroyed.  The tornado injured 14 people, said Trooper Wayne Beighle of the Texas Department of Public Safety.  "I am shocked no one was killed," said Charles Morehead, a special projects manager for West Texas Gas.  Morehead said the devastation in Cactus was akin to that which he saw in Higgins as a child. A tornado swept through the town, killing about 50 people on April 9, 1947. It remains the most destructive tornado in Texas Panhandle history. The tornado was a mile wide when it struck the city of Cactus. Buildings were flattened, power was knocked out to thousands, and debris was scattered for miles after the tornado.

Climate
According to the Köppen climate classification system, Cactus has a semiarid climate,  BSk on climate maps.

See also

Impact of the COVID-19 pandemic on the meat industry in the United States

References

External links and further reading
 "U.S. Raids 6 Meat Plants in ID Case", article The New York Times by Julia Preston, December 13, 2006

Cities in Texas
Cities in Moore County, Texas
Micropolitan areas of Texas